Jesse Michael-Geronimo Valencia is an American musician, author, and actor. He founded the music group Gorky
and authored a nonfiction book called Keep Music Evil: The Brian Jonestown Massacre Story.

Early life
Valencia's family moved to Show Low, Arizona when he was 15 years old. He graduated from Show Low High School. Valencia attended Northern Arizona University where he earned an undergraduate degree in humanities in 2011. He also received two masters degrees there, one in English - Creative Writing in 2014, and other in English - Literature in 2015. He has also served in the military police for the U.S. Army.

Career

Music career
Valencia founded the Indie rock band Gorky in Show Low, Arizona in 2001. In 2002, Ben Holladay joined on drums and played in the band ever since. The band have self-released three studio albums, including The Gork...And How To Get It! (2018), More Electric Music (2018) and Mathemagician (2019). The third album was recorded during Valencia's first semester at the David Lynch Graduate School of Cinematic Arts after learning the Transcendental Meditation technique, and released in April 2019 to coincide with the release of his debut nonfiction book, Keep Music Evil: The Brian Jonestown Massacre Story. Also in April, Gorky embarked on a short tour in support of Mathemagician, where Valencia would host author events at local bookstores and read from Keep Music Evil.

Author
In 2019, Valencia published the book Keep Music Evil: The Brian Jonestown Massacre Story, a narrative that explores the history of The Brian Jonestown Massacre band. Tony Creek of RockShot magazine wrote the book "Presented as a personal narrative that evokes the New Journalism of Tom Wolfe and Hunter S. Thompson, Keep Music Evil sets the record straight once and for all, providing close insights into the band’s origins in early 1990s San Francisco, their record-making process, and the full, unexpurgated tale of Dig! and its impact. Featuring rare, candid photographs of the band from throughout their career, this is the first comprehensive study of one of rock’n’roll’s most enduring sagas." The book includes Valencia's work from interviewing over 125 people connected to the band over ten years. It was included in a Vogue magazine article that listed what their editors were reading that summer.

Acting
Valencia made his on-screen acting debut opposite Tom Sizemore in the 2016 independent crime drama Durant's Never Closes, and later appeared in the art horror Bride of Violence and post-apocalyptic short film The Mad Man Of Miami. In 2019, he enrolled in the David Lynch Graduate School of Cinematic Arts for their screenwriting program at the Maharishi University of Management.

Sitgreaves County
As early as 2017, in order to promote Gorky's in-development musical film In The Land Of Good Oaks, Valencia began pushing the idea of a Sitgreaves County secession movement in the southern parts of Navajo and Apache Counties to local Republican groups in Northeastern Arizona. In the story of 'Good Oaks', the character Valencia was to play, Rhys Diaz, was similarly the creator of such a county. The stunt only made it as far as the local newspaper. From 2018 to 2020, as Valencia was in the David Lynch Graduate School of Cinematic Arts MFA in Screenwriting Program developing the screenplay to the film, ‘Sitgreaves County’ grew from a fizzled publicity stunt to a full-blown populist movement. During this time, Valencia successfully lobbied Rep. Walter Blackman and Sen. Wendy Rogers to each introduce their own Sitgreaves County study committee bills into the Arizona Legislature.

In 2021, Valencia pulled the plug on the final Sitgreaves County bill and revealed his intentions of promoting himself, Gorky, and the film after Navajo Nation President Jonathan Nez and Vice President Myron Lizer issued a formal letter to Governor Doug Ducey appealing to him to veto the bill if it passed, as the Navajo leadership interpreted any Sitgreaves County bill as being racist legislation directed against them.

After issuing an official apology to the Arizona State and Tribal Governments, Phoenix Magazine and The Arizona Republic released articles about the Sitgreaves County publicity stunt. Valencia subsequently released Gorky's 7th album "Sitgreaves County" on July 3, 2021.

References

External links
 

Living people
Northern Arizona University alumni
American male non-fiction writers
American male film actors
American multi-instrumentalists
Musicians from Arizona
Year of birth missing (living people)
Male actors from Arizona
Writers from Arizona